"Janie, Don't Take Your Love to Town" is a song by American rock singer Jon Bon Jovi. It was released in November 1997 as the third single from his second solo album, Destination Anywhere (1997). Commercially, the song reached number 13 on the UK Singles Chart and number 18 on Canada's RPM Top Singles chart. The song features a music video which was released on the DVD Destination Anywhere: The Film.

Critical reception
British magazine Music Week rated "Janie, Don't Take Your Love to Town" three out of five, adding, "Written after a row with Mrs Bon Jovi, the third single from Destination Anywhere is a plaintive cry, delivered with passion. Simple but nicely effective."

Track listings
All songs were written by Jon Bon Jovi.

 UK CD1 (574 987-2)
 "Janie, Don't Take Your Love to Town" (radio edit) – 3:53
 "Talk to Jesus" (demo) – 5:11
 "Billy Get Your Guns" (live) – 5:07
 "Janie, Don't Take Your Love to Town" – 5:17

 UK CD2 (574 989-2)
 "Janie, Don't Take Your Love to Town" (album version) – 5:18
 "Destination Anywhere" (live acoustic) – 4:43
 "It's Just Me" (live acoustic)  – 4:06
 "Janie, Don't Take Your Love to Town" (live acoustic) – 3:23

 UK cassette single (574 986-4)
 "Janie, Don't Take Your Love to Town" (radio edit) – 3:53
 "Talk to Jesus" (demo) – 5:11

Credits and personnel
Credits are lifted from the Destination Anywhere album booklet.

Recording
 Written in Amsterdam, June 1996
 Recorded and produced at Sanctuary Studios (New Jersey), August 1996
 Mixed at A&M Studios (Hollywood, California)
 Remixed at Quad Studios (New York City)
 Mastered at Sterling Sound (New York City)

Personnel

 Jon Bon Jovi – writing, vocals, backing vocals, electric and acoustic guitar, production
 Stephen Lironi – loops, production, programming
 Bobby Bandiera – lead guitar
 Hugh McDonald – bass
 Guy Davis – piano, Hammond organ
 Kenny Aronoff – drums
 David Campbell – string arrangement

 Obie O'Brien – mixing, remixing
 Jim Labinski – mixing assistant
 Ann Mincieli – remixing assistant
 Mike Rew – remixing assistant
 Niven Garland – engineering
 Mark Springer – engineering assistant
 George Marino – mastering

Charts

Release history

References

External links
 

1996 songs
1997 singles
Jon Bon Jovi songs
Mercury Records singles
Music videos directed by Mark Pellington
Songs written by Jon Bon Jovi